Fabiano Iha (born July 28, 1970) is a retired Brazilian mixed martial artist. He competed in the Lightweight division, fighting in several organizations, including the Ultimate Fighting Championship and PRIDE. He won his last fight by KO at LIP 1 - Lockdown in Paradise 1 against John Cox on March 19, 2005. Fabiano Iha received his BJJ black belt from Crolin Gracie.



Mixed martial arts record

|-
| Win
| align=center| 10–5
| John Cox
| KO (punches)
| Lockdown in Paradise 1
| 
| align=center| 1
| align=center| 0:30
| Lahaina, Hawaii, United States
| 
|-
| Win
| align=center| 9–5
| Shannon Ritch
| Submission (rear-naked choke)
| Hitman Fighting Productions 3
| 
| align=center| N/A
| align=center| N/A
| Santa Ana, California, United States
| 
|-
| Win
| align=center| 8–5
| Flavio Troccoli
| Submission (armbar)
| Hitman Fighting Productions 2
| 
| align=center| 1
| align=center| 0:53
| Santa Ana, California, United States
| 
|-
| Loss
| align=center| 7–5
| Din Thomas
| Decision (unanimous)
| UFC 33
| 
| align=center| 3
| align=center| 5:00
| Las Vegas, Nevada, United States
| 
|-
| Loss
| align=center| 7–4
| Caol Uno
| KO (punches)
| UFC 32
| 
| align=center| 1
| align=center| 1:48
| East Rutherford, New Jersey, United States
| 
|-
| Win
| align=center| 7–3
| Phil Johns
| Submission (armbar)
| UFC 30
| 
| align=center| 1
| align=center| 2:05
| Atlantic City, New Jersey, United States
| 
|-
| Win
| align=center| 6–3
| Daiju Takase
| TKO (strikes)
| UFC 29
| 
| align=center| 1
| align=center| 2:24
| Tokyo, Japan
| 
|-
| Win
| align=center| 5–3
| Laverne Clark
| Submission (armbar)
| UFC 27
| 
| align=center| 1
| align=center| 1:10
| New Orleans, Louisiana, United States
| 
|-
| Win
| align=center| 4–3
| Danny Bennett
| Submission (armbar)
| KOTC 4 - Gladiators
| 
| align=center| 1
| align=center| 0:49
| San Jacinto, California, United States
| 
|-
| Loss
| align=center| 3–3
| Dave Menne
| Decision (unanimous)
| UFC 24
| 
| align=center| 3
| align=center| 5:00
| Lake Charles, Louisiana, United States
| 
|-
| Loss
| align=center| 3–2
| Frank Trigg
| TKO (punches)
| Pride 8
| 
| align=center| 1
| align=center| 5:00
| Tokyo, Japan
| 
|-
| Loss
| align=center| 3–1
| Laverne Clark
| TKO (doctor stoppage)
| UFC 20
| 
| align=center| 1
| align=center| 1:31
| Birmingham, Alabama, United States
| 
|-
| Win
| align=center| 3–0
| Cleber Luciano
| KO (punch)
| rowspan=2|Extreme Challenge 22
| rowspan=2|
| align=center| 1
| align=center| 7:57
| rowspan=2|West Valley City, Utah, United States
| 
|-
| Win
| align=center| 2–0
| Yves Edwards
| Submission (armbar)
| align=center| 1
| align=center| 3:56
| 
|-
| Win
| align=center| 1–0
| John Borsos
| Submission (armbar)
| Neutral Grounds 5
| 
| align=center| 1
| align=center| 0:25
| N/A
|

References

External links
 
 

 http://www.fcfighter.com/ufc20bio.htm

Brazilian male mixed martial artists
Lightweight mixed martial artists
Mixed martial artists utilizing Brazilian jiu-jitsu
Ultimate Fighting Championship male fighters
Brazilian practitioners of Brazilian jiu-jitsu
Sportspeople from Florianópolis
1970 births
Living people
People awarded a black belt in Brazilian jiu-jitsu